Sequoia, Sequoya or Sequoyah may refer to:

Science and technology

Biology
 Sequoioideae, a three-genus subfamily of the cypress family
 Sequoia (genus), a genus with one living  and several fossil species
 Sequoia sempervirens, coast redwood, found along the coast of California and Oregon
 Sequoiadendron giganteum (giant sequoia), the sequoia tree found on the slopes of the Sierra Nevada of California
 Metasequoia, dawn redwood
 The Great Sequoia, a sequoia tree in Vitoria-Gasteiz, Basque Country, Spain

Other science and technology
 1103 Sequoia, a minor planet
 Sequoia (supercomputer), an IBM supercomputer at Lawrence Livermore National Laboratory, US
 HFS Plus, a file system codenamed Sequoia
 Sequoia-PGP, an OpenPGP implementation written in Rust

Arts and entertainment
 Old Sequoia, a 1945 American animated short film directed by Jack King
 Sequoia (1934 film), an American drama film
 Sequoia (2014 film), an American film
 Sequoia (comics), a Marvel Comics character
 Sequoia (composition), by American composer Joan Tower
 "Sequoia", a song by Way Out West from Way Out West
 Sequoya (Ream), a bronze sculpture
 Sequoya (St. John's University's Literary Magazine)

Places

United States
 State of Sequoyah, an attempt in the early 20th century by Native Americans to form their own state
 Canyon, California, formerly Sequoya
 Mount Sequoyah, Great Smoky Mountains
 Sequoia Hall, home of the Statistics Department of Stanford University
 Sequoia Hospital, Redwood City, California
 Sequoia National Park, a national park in the southern Sierra Nevada, California
 Sequoia National Forest, adjacent to the Sequoia National Park
 Giant Sequoia National Monument, monument administered as part of the National Forest
 Sequoia Park Zoo, in Eureka, California
 Sequoyah County, Oklahoma, a county in mid-eastern Oklahoma bordering Arkansas
 Sequoyah Nuclear Plant, Tennessee
 Sequoyah, Oklahoma, an unincorporated community in northeastern Oklahoma

Elsewhere
 Tour Sequoia, an office skyscraper in Paris, France

Schools
 Sequoia Middle School (disambiguation), several schools
 Sequoia High School (disambiguation), several schools
 Sequoyah High School (Georgia), public school in Canton, Georgia
 Sequoyah High School (Claremore, Oklahoma), public school
 Sequoyah High School (Tahlequah, Oklahoma), high school and Native American boarding school
 Sequoyah School, a non-profit, independent alternative school in Pasadena, California
 Sequoia University, a defunct Los Angeles diploma mill

Companies
 Sequoia Capital, a venture capital firm
 Sequoia Voting Systems, a California company that provides electronic voting systems
 Sequoia Fund, a Ruane, Cunniff & Goldfarb investment fund

Transport
 Sequoia Falco, a light, acrobatic aircraft
 Sequoia Field Airport, near Visalia, California, US
 Toyota Sequoia, a sport utility vehicle
 USS Sequoia, several US Navy ships
 USS Sequoia (presidential yacht), U.S. presidential yacht
 USS Sequoyah (SP-426), a patrol boat in commission from 1917 to 1919

People
 Sequoyah (1767–1843), American Indian silversmith and inventor of the Cherokee syllabary
 Johnny Sequoyah (Johnny Sequoyah Friedenberg, born 2002), American child actress

Other uses
 Sequoyah (horse), Irish Thoroughbred racehorse
 Secoya (disambiguation)